The Congress of the State of Colima (aka Congress of Colima) is the legislative branch of  the government of the State of Colima.   The Congress of Colima is a unicameral legislature.

The Congress consist of 25 local deputies (16 elected by the first-past-the-post system and 9 by proportional representation). Deputies are elected to serve for a three-year term.  

Since its installation the congress has been renewed 55 times, hence the current session of the Congress of Colima (whose term lasts from 2009 to 2012) is known as the LVI Legislature.

Current composition by party
The LIV Legislature of the Congress of Colima consists of 25 deputies.

The LX Legislature of the Congress of Colima consists of 25 deputies.

See also
List of Mexican state congresses

External links
Congress of Colima website

Colima, Congress of
Congress
Colima